Shigeru (written: , , ,  in hiragana or  in katakana) is a masculine Japanese given name. Notable people with the name include:

, a Japanese architect
, a Japanese voice actor
, Japanese karateka
, Japanese sport wrestler
, Japanese socialist politician
, Japanese painter and printmaker
, Japanese actor and singer
, Japanese artistic gymnast
, Japanese Ainu activist
, Japanese baseball player
, Japanese rower
, a video game designer for Nintendo, notable for creating Mario among many other characters
, expert on yokai and creator of the popular manga series Ge Ge Ge no Kitaro, and others
, Japanese baseball player
, Japanese voice actor
, Japanese politician
, Japanese karateka
, Japanese general
, Japanese ice hockey player
 Shigeru Takashina (1943–2013), Japanese karateka
, a Japanese automotive team lead, designer, and engineer at Honda, notable for his work on Honda NSX and Honda S2000 projects
, a Japanese film score composer
, Japanese diplomat and politician, former Prime Minister

Fictional characters
, from Akagi
, a character from Neon Genesis Evangelion

, a character from Yakitate!! Japan
, the Japanese name of Gary Oak, a Pokémon character (named after Shigeru Miyamoto)
 Otori Shigeru, a character in Lian Hearn's popular Tales of the Otori trilogy
 Shigeru Yahaba, a character from Haikyu!!

Japanese masculine given names